Haiyang is a town under the administration of Haigang District, Qinhuangdao, Hebei, China. , it has 17 villages under its administration:
Haiyang First Village
Haiyang Second Village
Haiyang Third Village
Haiyang Fourth Village
Fanzhuang Village
Houzhuang Village
Guogaozhuang Village
Liyuan Village
Lipanzhuang Village
Daweizhigang Village
Xiaoweizhigang Village
Wenjiawa Village
Qingshishan Village
Daliying Village
Xiwangling Village
Xitianjiagou Village
Xinzhouzhuang Village

References 

Township-level divisions of Hebei
Qinhuangdao